The attack on the Israeli consulate in Berlin was perpetrated by PKK supporters on the Israeli consulate in Berlin, Germany, on 17 February 1999. Three people were killed and 14 were injured after security forces at the consulate opened fire on the PKK supporters.

Background
In October 1998 Abdullah Öcalan, leader of the PKK, was forced to leave Syria for Moscow, Russia, where he was not allowed to stay, before flying to Rome, Italy. The Italian government did not want to allow Öcalan to stay, however they were legally not permitted to extradite him to Turkey, where he could face the death penalty. After being denied entrance to Germany, the Netherlands and France, Öcalan went to Greece on 1 February 1999. He was captured on 15 February 1999, while being transferred from the Greek embassy to Jomo Kenyatta International Airport in Nairobi, in an operation by the Millî İstihbarat Teşkilâtı, with alleged help of the CIA or Mossad.

Attack
Worldwide protests broke out after the news of Öcalan's capture, which took place in Kenya by Turkish intelligence, with cooperation of Greece. 55 to 200 PKK supporters armed with iron bars stormed the Israeli consulate in Berlin on 17 February, accusing the Mossad of allegedly helping the Turkish government in kidnapping Öcalan. When the protesters managed to break through police ranks and enter the consulate building, Israeli security opened fire on the attackers, killing three and injuring 14. Later, German police arrested 30 PKK supporters and cordoned off all area as helicopters circled over consulate building.

Aftermath
Benjamin Netanyahu defended the actions of defense forces, saying that protesters attempted to take a weapon from one of the security forces. Israel increased the guard on all its missions abroad.

References

1999 in Berlin
1999 in international relations
Attacks on diplomatic missions of Israel
February 1999 crimes
February 1999 events in Europe
Germany–Israel relations
Hostage taking in Germany
Kurdistan Workers' Party attacks
Terrorist incidents in Berlin
Terrorist incidents in Germany in 1999
1999 murders in Germany
1990s murders in Berlin